The 1804 New Hampshire gubernatorial election took place on March 13, 1804. Incumbent Federalist Governor John Taylor Gilman won re-election to an eleventh term, defeating Democratic-Republican candidate, former Governor and U.S. Senator John Langdon in a re-match of the previous year's election.

Results

References

Notes 

Gubernatorial
New Hampshire
1804